The 2004–05 Magyar Kupa (English: Hungarian Cup) was the 65th season of Hungary's annual knock-out cup football competition.

Quarter-finals
Games were played on April 6, 2005.

|}

Semi-finals
Games were played on April 20, 2005.

|}

Final

See also
 2004–05 Nemzeti Bajnokság I
 2004–05 Nemzeti Bajnokság II

References

External links
 Official site 
 soccerway.com

2004–05 in Hungarian football
2004–05 domestic association football cups
2004-05